Uztárroz – Uztarroze is a town and municipality located in the province and autonomous community of Navarre, northern Spain. According to 2017 census, it had a population of 146.

References

External links
 UZTARROZ - UZTARROTZE in the Bernardo Estornés Lasa - Auñamendi Encyclopedia (Euskomedia Fundazioa) 
 

Municipalities in Navarre